The Longyou Protectorate was a protectorate of the Northern Song dynasty. It was created in 1104 after the Northern Song had occupied the former territories of Tsongkha.

References

Former protectorates
Song dynasty politics
1104 establishments in Asia
12th-century establishments in China